Tooting is a constituency created in 1974 in Greater London. It is represented in the House of Commons of the UK Parliament since 2016 by Dr. Rosena Allin-Khan, a member of the Labour Party.

Boundaries 

1974–1983: The London Borough of Wandsworth wards of Bedford, Furzedown, Graveney, Springfield, and Tooting.

1983–2010: As above plus Earlsfield, and Nightingale

2010–present: As above minus Springfield, plus Wandsworth Common.

Tooting is the south-eastern third of the London Borough of Wandsworth. In addition to Tooting, it includes the districts of Earlsfield, Furzedown and Streatham Park and part of Balham. The constituency includes part of Wandsworth Common, a rectangular open space that lends its name to one of the seven wards.

Tooting since 2010 is bordered to the west by Putney and Wimbledon; to the other three compass points by Mitcham and Morden, Streatham and Battersea.

History 
The constituency was created for the February 1974 election from areas which, prior to that election, were within Battersea South, Streatham and Wandsworth Central.

Political history
Held by Labour since its creation, Tooting was a target seat for the Conservatives at the 2010 general election after the party made gains in local elections. However, Sadiq Khan was able to retain the seat for Labour. The Conservatives have generally performed best in the northern half of the seat (Bedford, Earlsfield, Nightingale, Wandsworth Common), whereas Labour are strongest in the southern half, which covers Tooting ward itself, Graveney and Furzedown.

The 2015 general election result gave the seat the twenty-fourth-most marginal majority of Labour's 232 seats by percentage of majority. Had the majority obtained by Allin-Khan at her 2016 by-election win been part of the 2015 results, the seat would have been the 136th safest of Labour's 232 seats by percentage of majority.

In the 2016 referendum to leave the European Union, the constituency voted remain by 74.7%.

Local government indications
As in the other two constituencies located in the London Borough of Wandsworth, voters have in part supported the Conservatives at local level; however, the southern area has strong enough Labour support to have consistently returned at least seven Labour councillors since 1992.

Prominent frontbenchers
Sadiq Khan, a solicitor by profession, was the Minister of State for Transport and Minister of State for Communities in the government of Gordon Brown. In opposition after 2010, he became the Shadow Secretary of State for Justice and Lord Chancellor. He was the Labour Party's candidate in the 2016 London mayoral election, and was subsequently elected as Mayor of London. Following his election, Khan announced his intention to resign as MP for Tooting, and on 9 May 2016 he was appointed to the ancient office of Crown Steward and Bailiff of The Three Chiltern Hundreds, triggering a by-election.

Constituency profile 
The modern Tooting constituency is a simplified name, as it contains much of Balham, Wandsworth Common and Earlsfield, yet the southernmost parts of the area that self-identifies as Tooting are actually in the London Borough of Merton and so in the Mitcham and Morden seat.

Transport links to Central London are good, and the population has expanded steadily due to the area's popularity with commuters looking for affordable property.

Unemployment benefit claimants and registered jobseekers, in November 2012 were lower than the national average of 3.8%, at 3.2% of the population based on a statistical compilation by The Guardian.

Members of Parliament

Elections

Elections in the 2010s

Elections in the 2000s

Elections in the 1990s

Elections in the 1980s

Elections in the 1970s

See also 
 List of parliamentary constituencies in London
 London Borough of Wandsworth

Notes

References

External links 
Politics Resources (Election results from 1922 onwards)
Electoral Calculus (Election results from 1955 onwards)
Labour Party in Wandsworth
Conservative Party in Wandsworth
Liberal Democrats in Wandsworth
Election Maps (Constituency maps)

Politics of the London Borough of Wandsworth
Parliamentary constituencies in London
Constituencies of the Parliament of the United Kingdom established in 1974
Tooting